The Champ is a 1931 American pre-Code film starring Wallace Beery and Jackie Cooper and directed by King Vidor from a screenplay by Frances Marion, Leonard Praskins and Wanda Tuchock.  The picture tells the story of a washed-up alcoholic boxer (Beery) attempting to put his life back together for the sake of his young son (Cooper).

Beery won the Academy Award for Best Actor for his performance (sharing the prize with Fredric March for Dr. Jekyll and Mr. Hyde), Frances Marion won the Academy Award for Best Story, and the film was nominated for the Academy Award for Best Picture and Best Director. In February 2020, the film was shown at the 70th Berlin International Film Festival, as part of a retrospective dedicated to King Vidor's career.

Plot
Andy "Champ" Purcell (Wallace Beery) is the former world heavyweight champion, now down on his luck and living in squalid conditions with his eight-year-old son "Dink" in Tijuana, Mexico. Champ attempts to train and to convince promoters to set up a fight for him, but his efforts are consistently stymied by his alcoholism. Dink is repeatedly disappointed and let down by his father's irresponsible actions and frequent broken promises to quit drinking, but his utter devotion to his father nonetheless never wavers.

In addition to his drinking problem, Champ is also a compulsive gambler, another vice which he repeatedly promises Dink he will surrender (but never does). After a winning streak, he fulfills a previous promise to buy Dink a horse, whom they subsequently name "Little Champ" and decide to enter into a race. At the track, Dink happens across a woman who, unknown to either of them, is actually his mother Linda. She is now remarried to Tony, a wealthy man who owns one of the other horses in the race.

Linda and Tony observe Dink and Champ together and realize that Dink is her son. Champ allows Linda to see Dink, who accepts that she is his mother. But Dink feels no emotion toward her, as she has never been part of his life. Linda resolves to remove Dink from the miserable atmosphere in which he's growing up and have him live with her family.

Catching Champ during an all-night gambling binge, Tony asks him to turn Dink over so that Tony and Linda can put Dink into school. Champ refuses. As the exhausted Dink sleeps on a nearby table, Tony bluntly observes that Champ is not a good father. The night of gambling ends with Champ having lost Little Champ, which devastates Dink. Champ asks Linda for enough money to buy the horse back, and she gives it to him. But before he can buy the horse back, he starts gambling again and loses the money Linda loaned him. He also winds up in jail, breaking Dink's heart once more.

Ashamed of his actions and with his spirit broken, Champ finally agrees to send an unwilling Dink to live with Tony and Linda. On the train ride home, Tony and Linda try their best to welcome Dink into their family. Dink does not dislike them, but he is consumed only by thoughts of his father. He runs away back to Tijuana, where he finds that Champ has a fight scheduled with the Mexican heavyweight champion.  When he sees Dink, Champ immediately returns to good spirits. He trains hard for the fight and, for the first time, really does stay away from drinking and gambling. Champ is determined to win the fight, make Dink proud of him, and use his prize money to buy back Little Champ.

Tony and Linda attend the fight, bringing genuine best wishes and assurances that they will make no further efforts to separate Dink from Champ. The match is brutal, and Champ is seriously injured. Dink and the others in his corner urge him to throw in the towel, but Champ refuses to allow that. He musters a last burst of energy, and knocks out his opponent. After the fight, he triumphantly presents Little Champ to Dink. But after witnessing his son's overjoyed reaction, Champ collapses.

Champ is brought into his dressing room, where a doctor determines that his injuries are mortal. Champ urges Dink to cheer up and then dies, leaving Dink inconsolable. Despite the best efforts of all of the men and boys in the room, who one by one attempt to calm him, Dink continually wails, "I want the Champ!" Finally, Dink spots Linda enter the room. Dink looks at her, cries out, "Mother!" and runs into her arms. She picks him up and he sobs, "The Champ is dead, mama." She turns and carries him out of the room as he buries his face in her shoulder, crying.

Cast
 Wallace Beery as Andy "Champ" Purcell
 Jackie Cooper as Dink Purcell
 Irene Rich as Linda Purcell
 Roscoe Ates as Sponge
 Edward Brophy as Tim
 Hale Hamilton as Tony
 Jesse Scott as Jonah
 Marcia Mae Jones as Mary Lou

Production
Screenwriter Frances Marion wrote the title role specifically for Wallace Beery, whose formerly flourishing career, which had almost abruptly ended with the advent of sound, had been revitalized in 1930 with an Academy Award nomination for The Big House and the huge success of Min and Bill with Marie Dressler. Director King Vidor eagerly took on the film since it emphasized the traditional family values and strong belief in hope—qualities he felt were essential to a good motion picture. Wallace Beery claimed to have turned down a $500,000 offer from a syndicate of Indian studios to play Buddha in order to take the role in The Champ. Cooper was paid $1,500 a week while working on the film. A special outdoor set, rather than location shooting, was built to accommodate the Tijuana horse racing track scenes. Shooting began in mid-August 1931 and ended eight weeks later, at which time Jackie Cooper's contract with Paramount Pictures was transferred to MGM.

The Champ debuted on November 9, 1931, at the Astor Theatre in New York City. Beery flew his own plane from Los Angeles, California cross-country to attend the premiere. After the film's debut, Beery declared Cooper was a "great kid" but that he would not work with the child actor again, a promise he broke within the year for the remake of Treasure Island.

Assessment

The film, along with Beery's role in Min and Bill, catapulted Beery's career. Beery signed a contract with MGM shortly thereafter specifying that he receive a dollar more per year than any other actor on the lot, effectively making him the world's highest-paid actor.  The picture also made nine-year-old Jackie Cooper the first child star of the 1930s, an era noted for its numerous, popular child actors.

At the time the movie was released, critics criticized the film's lack of originality. For example, The New York Times declared that "something more novel and subtle" was needed, although it also praised Beery's acting. Variety, too, very much liked Beery in the film, noting that he delivered a "studied, adult" performance. Time called the film repetitive, blasted Cooper for sniveling, and accused director King Vidor of laying "on pathos with a steam-shovel." Nonetheless, Time praised the movie, declaring it "Utterly false and thoroughly convincing..." Many critics cited the "special chemistry" between Beery and Cooper, which led the two actors to be paired again numerous times. Cooper and Beery had no such chemistry off-screen. Cooper accused Beery of upstaging and other attempts to undermine his performances, out of what Cooper presumed was jealousy. Critics today still highly praise The Champ.

The Champ has been described as an inverted women's film, because men in the film are not generally depicted at the top of the socio-economic ladder but are shown as a primary childcare provider. The famous final scene, in which the camera is thrust into Jackie Cooper's weeping face, has been compared to similar aggressive and intrusive camera work in classic motion pictures such as Liebelei (Max Ophüls, dir.; 1933) and Broken Blossoms (D.W. Griffith, dir.; 1919), and the films of Roberto Rossellini.

The Champ has had significant cultural effect. A number of motion pictures in the 1930s, some of them also starring Wallace Beery, repeated the basic story about a man surrendering to drink and redeemed by the love of his long-suffering son. Film critic Judith Crist has argued that almost any film pairing an adult actor alongside a child actor must be compared to The Champ in terms of the chemistry between the actors and the effectiveness of the film. The film had an immediate effect on world cinema as well. The Champ is considered one source film which inspired Yasujirō Ozu's classic Japanese film, Passing Fancy (Dekigokoro, 1933). The film was, in part, the inspiration for the father and son in the Berenstain Bears books.

Reception
The Champ was a big hit upon its release. According to MGM records, the film earned $917,000 domestically and $683,000 foreign.

Remakes
The movie was remade in 1952 as The Clown, starring Red Skelton as a washed-up clown rather than a washed-up boxer. It was remade again in 1979 by Franco Zeffirelli (see The Champ).

References

External links 
 
 
 
 
 

1931 films
1930s English-language films
1930s sports drama films
American sports drama films
American boxing films
Films about alcoholism
American black-and-white films
Films directed by King Vidor
Metro-Goldwyn-Mayer films
Films featuring a Best Actor Academy Award-winning performance
Films that won the Academy Award for Best Story
Films produced by Harry Rapf
Films produced by Irving Thalberg
Films set in Tijuana
1931 drama films
1930s American films